Chubar Rural District is a rural district (dehestan) in Haviq District, Talesh County, Gilan Province, Iran. At the 2006 census, its population was 16,429, in 3,700 families. The rural district has 50 villages.

References 

Rural Districts of Gilan Province
Talesh County